Who Am I? or Who Am I may refer to:

Film 
 Who Am I? (1921 film). a silent  drama directed by Henry Kolker
 Who Am I? (1998 film), a Hong Kong film starring Jackie Chan
 Who Am I? (2009 film), a Cambodian film
 Who Am I (2014 film), or Who Am I – No System is Safe, a 2014 German film
 Who Am I 2015, a 2015 Chinese film
 Who Am I (2023 film), an upcoming Indian Hindi film

Music

Albums 

 Who Am I (Drapht album)
 Who Am I (B1A4 album)
 Who Am I? (Pale Waves album)

Songs 
 "Who Am I?" (Casting Crowns song), 2003
 "Who Am I" (Katy B song), 2016
 "Who Am I?" (Petula Clark song), 1966
 "Who Am I" (Will Young song), 2005
 "Who Am I (Sim Simma)", by Beenie Man, 1997
 "Who Am I? (What's My Name?)", by Snoop Doggy Dogg, 1993
 "Who Am I", by Ace of Base from The Golden Ratio, 2010
 "Who Am I", by New Found Glory from Catalyst, 2004
 "Who Am I", by Parachute Express from Feel the Music, 1986
 "Who Am I", by Royce da 5'9" from Rock City, 2002
 "Who Am I?", by Craig's Brother from Homecoming, 1998
 "Who Am I?", by Peace Orchestra from Peace Orchestra, 1999
 "Who Am I?", by Rusty Goodman, 1969
 "Who Am I", by Leonard Bernstein from the musical Peter Pan, 1950
 "Who Am I?" soundtrack by Jule Styne and Walter Bullock from the film Hit Parade of 1941, 1940
 "Who Am I?", song from the musical Les Misérables
 "Who Am I?", song featured in the SpongeBob SquarePants episode "Mimic Madness", 2017
 "Who Am I?", song performed by Cameron Diaz, Jamie Foxx and, Quvenzhané Wallis, from the musical Annie, 2014
 "Who Am I", by Status Quo from Rockin' All Over the World, 1977

Other 

 "Who Am I", teachings of Sri Ramana Maharshi on self-enquiry
 Who Am I?, a 1966 religious education book by Katherine Paterson
 A question about personal identity

See also
 "Who Am I This Time?", a short story by Kurt Vonnegut
 Who Am I This Time? (film), a film adaptation of Vonnegut's story
 whoami, a shell command
 "Raise Up", a 2001 song by Petey Pablo